Ralph Hudgens (born November 21, 1942) was the Commissioner of Insurance of the state of Georgia from January 10, 2011, to January 14, 2019. Hudgens served in the Georgia House of Representatives as well as the Georgia Senate. He has been a delegate to numerous Republican Party events. Hudgens defeated his Democratic opponent in the 2010 election with 53.8% of the vote. He was re-elected in 2014. He announced on July 17, 2017, that he would not run for re-election in 2018. Hudgens believed insurance rates should be allowed to increase based on competition and not regulation as did former regulatory favorable Commissioner John Oxendine. During Hudgens's time in office Georgia auto insurance rates greatly increased including one year Georgia experienced the highest increase in the United States. Hudgens and his wife, Suzanne, have four children and twelve grandchildren.

Views on Obamacare
With regard to Obamacare, as the Georgia Insurance Commissioner, Hudgens has opposed the implementation of Affordable Care Act and vowed to be an "obstructionist" while speaking to a group of Republicans at the Tillman Hanger Rally in Floyd County, Georgia. However, Hudgens later admitted "I spoke to a Republican group in Rome, Ga., and I said I was going to be an obstructionist, but I can’t be. I mean, I was talking to a Republican group and I was throwing them some red meat."

At the CSRA Republican Women's Club meeting, he criticized the Affordable Care Act by likening the patients with preexisting condition to a car driver that has gotten in an accident and seeks car insurance post incident. He has since retracted his remarks and stated, "I've had family members, I've had friends - who have pre-existing conditions. It's not the person's fault they have a pre-existing condition."

Recent controversy
At a Georgia Republican public event in August 2014, Hudgens was speaking and happened to notice a journalist, Nydia Tisdale, videotaping the event, which caused him to direct a comment at her, publicly stating "I don't know why you're videotaping". This led to some apparent discomfort, in spite of her already having had approval to record the public event. Subsequently, the police arrested Tisdale, with accusations currently being leveled both at the police as well as at Tisdale. At this time, the dispute has not been settled but video has surfaced of the event.

Electoral history

References

Sources
https://web.archive.org/web/20101128141802/http://ralphhudgens.com/about_ralph
http://sos.georgia.gov/elections/election_results/2010_1102/00250.htm

1942 births
21st-century American politicians
Republican Party Georgia (U.S. state) state senators
Living people
Republican Party members of the Georgia House of Representatives
Politicians from Miami
Southern Baptists
State insurance commissioners of the United States
University of Florida alumni